USS Oswald A. Powers (DE-542) was a United States Navy John C. Butler-class destroyer escort launched during World War II but never completed.

Namesake

Oswald Aaron Powers was born on 25 November 1915 in Marine City, Michigan. He enlisted in the United States Naval Reserve as a seaman 2nd class, V-5, USNR, on 6 November 1940 at the United States Naval Reserve Aviation Base Grosse Ile, Michigan, and was placed on inactive duty that same day. Appointed aviation cadet, USNR, on 5 February 1941, to rank from 1 February 1941, he was transferred to Naval Air Station Pensacola on 6 February 1941, and was issued a good discharge as a seaman 2nd class on 9 February 1941 to accept his appointment as aviation cadet.

Reporting to Naval Air Station Pensacola on 10 February 1941, Powers was appointed a "naval aviator (heavier than air)" on 12 August 1941. On 5 September 1941, he was promoted to ensign, A-V(N), USNR. Five days later, on 10 September 1941, Ensign Powers was detached from NAS Miami and was transferred to the Advanced Carrier Training Group, United States Pacific Fleet, at Naval Air Station San Diego in San Diego, California, reporting on 3 October 1941. Detached from Naval Air Station San Diego on 4 November 1941, he reported to Torpedo Squadron 3 (VT-3), based aboard the aircraft carrier  on 5 November 1941. After an Imperial Japanese Navy submarine torpedoed Saratoga on 11 January 1942 VT-3 was based ashore, first at Naval Air Station Pearl Harbor on Ford Island in Pearl Harbor, then at Naval Air Station Kaneohe Bay, Hawaii, whence the squadron trained and continued to stand alerts.

On 30 May 1942, assigned to the air group of aircraft carrier , replacing Torpedo Squadron 5 (VT-5) aboard Yorktown, VT-3 flew aboard as Yorktown departed Pearl Harbor to participate in the Battle of Midway. Circumstances, however, dictated that only the Yorktown Air Group attacked as a unit, with VT-3 the last of the three American carrier torpedo squadrons to execute attacks against the Japanese carriers. Japanese Mitsubishi A6M2 Type 00 carrier fighters, however, overwhelmed the six-plane VF-3 covering element, and, in concert with heavy antiaircraft fire from the Japanese carriers and their screening ships, shot down ten of the twelve VT-3's Douglas TBD Devastator torpedo bombers participating in the raid. Powers and his radio gunner, Seaman 2nd Class Joseph E. Mandeville, perished in the attack. He was posthumously awarded the Navy Cross.

Construction
The name Oswald A. Powers was assigned to DE–542 on 28 September 1943. Oswald A. Powers was laid down at the Boston Navy Yard at Boston, Massachusetts, on 18 November 1943 and launched on 17 December 1943, sponsored by Mrs. Ella M. Powers, mother of Ensign Oswald A. Powers, the ship namesake.

Construction of Oswald A. Powers was suspended before she could be completed.  On 30 August 1945, she was assigned to the Atlantic Inactive Fleet in an incomplete state. On 7 January 1946, the contract for her construction was cancelled, and the incomplete ship was sold on 17 June 1947 to the John J. Duane Company of Quincy, Massachusetts, for scrapping.

Notes

References

Navsource Online: Destroyer Escort Photo Archive: USS Oswald A. Powers (DE-542)

John C. Butler-class destroyer escorts
Cancelled ships of the United States Navy
Ships built in Quincy, Massachusetts
1943 ships